William Whitmore Robinson (6 September 1908 – 11 July 1968) was an Australian rules footballer who played three games with Melbourne in the Victorian Football League (VFL).

He later played for Preston in the Victorian Football Association.

Notes

External links 

1908 births
Australian rules footballers from Victoria (Australia)
Melbourne Football Club players
Preston Football Club (VFA) players
1968 deaths